Wulfgifu (or Wulviva) was an Anglo-Saxon noblewoman. Her name survives in that of the Herefordshire village of Woolhope, meaning "Wulfgifu's Hope" (hope = valley).

The manor of Woolhope, along with three others, was given to the cathedral at Hereford before the Norman Conquest by Wulviva and her sister (Lady) Godiva. The church has a 20th-century stained glass window showing them.

Notes

External links
 Woolhope on Open Domesday

11th-century English landowners
Anglo-Saxon women